Newton's Law is an Australian television drama series that began airing on ABC TV on 9 February 2017. The eight-part series was developed from an original concept by Deb Cox and Fiona Eagger.

Premise
The series follows Josephine Newton (Claudia Karvan), a suburban solicitor with an overdeveloped sense of responsibility who attempts to return to her briefly glorious stint at the Bar. After Josephine's modest neighborhood solicitor's practice is incinerated by arson, she is persuaded by an old university friend and not-so-secret admirer, Lewis Hughes QC (Toby Schmitz), to join the high-flying Knox Chambers. With her marriage collapsing and motherhood fast losing its charm, Josephine decides it's time to again put on her wig and barrister's robe.

Cast
 Claudia Karvan as Josephine Newton
 Toby Schmitz as Lewis Hughes QC
 Brett Tucker as Callum Docker 
 Georgina Naidu as Helena Chatterjee
 Sean Keenan as Johnny Allbright
 Miranda Tapsell as Skye Stewart
 Andrew McFarlane as Eric Whitley QC
 Jane Hall as Jackie Russo
 Ming-Zhu Hii as Claire Zhang 
 Makwaya Masudi as Zareb Mulumba
 Ella Newton as Lydia Newton-Docker
 Freya Stafford as Rose Newton
 Jason Agius as Nikos Aristides
 Simon Maiden as Alan Edgeworth
 Lester Ellis Jr. as Gregor 'Spike' Zdunowski

Episodes

Ratings

References

External links
 

Australian drama television series
Australian legal television series
2017 Australian television series debuts
2017 Australian television series endings
English-language television shows
Television shows set in Victoria (Australia)
Australian Broadcasting Corporation original programming